Shinichi Sakamoto (born 16 April 1954) is a Japanese former professional tennis player.

Sakamoto competed in the doubles main draw of the 1979 Wimbledon Championships and 1980 French Open, both times with Shigeyuki Nishio as his partner.

During the early 1980s, Sakamoto played in six Davis Cup ties for Japan. This included a 1981 tie against France, in which he lost a match to Thierry Tulasne by a scoreline of 0–6, 0–6, 0–6. In 1985 he played in a World Group fixture against the United States.

See also
List of Japan Davis Cup team representatives

References

External links
 
 
 

1954 births
Living people
Japanese male tennis players
20th-century Japanese people
21st-century Japanese people